Luis Arturo Zúñiga Jory (born 1 December 1982) is a Chilean politician who served as Undersecretary of Assistance Networks. Zúñiga served as chief of staff for health minister Jaime Mañalich during the first term of president Sebastián Piñera and as health director for the commune of Panguipulli.

In 2021, he was elected as constituent.

Notes

References 

 
Living people
1982 births
Pontifical Catholic University of Chile alumni
Independent Democratic Union politicians
Members of the Chilean Constitutional Convention